Vargach (also known as Vard Gach) is a village in Sumar Rural District, Sumar District, Qasr-e Shirin County, Kermanshah Province, Iran. At the 2006 census, its population was 38, in 11 families. The village is populated by Kurds.

References 

Populated places in Qasr-e Shirin County
Kurdish settlements in Kermanshah Province